The Washington Backcountry Discovery Route is a , mostly off-road trail traversing the Cascade Mountains in the U.S. state of Washington. The entire route is double track suitable for motorized users (four-wheel drive automobile or dual-sport motorcycle) and non-motorized users (mountain bike). The route was created by Bryce Stevens and Andrew Cull. In 2007 Steve Bisig of Pacific Northwest Adventures successfully completed and published a 4x4 route from the Oregon to Canadian border that consisted of more off-road trails (Washington Cascades Overland Tour).

Backcountry Discovery Routes is a 501(c)(4) education and advocacy non-profit that supports off-road route development and dissemination of route information to riders on the Washington Backcountry Route and others in Utah, Colorado, Arizona, and Idaho. The state of Oregon has a collection of five interconnected routes that are similar to the Washington Route and was created in the late 1990s by the Oregon Off Highway Vehicle Association.

Bibliography/Videography
Butler Maps has produced a map of the route in association with Helge Pedersen and others, and Noren Films has produced a documentary DVD about the mapping expedition.

References

External links

Motorcycle rallies in the United States